Queens Place is an approved residential complex of twin skyscrapers, to be built on 350 Queen Street in Melbourne, Victoria. Upon completion, they will be amongst the tallest buildings in Melbourne, and the tallest twin skyscrapers in Australia.

The 350 Queen Street site, which hosts KTS House –a 21-story office building– was purchased by Chinese developers 3L Alliance in October 2014, for $135 million. These plans would retain the KTS House commercial skyscraper, which would sit in between the twin skyscrapers.

In October 2015, the project received planning approval by the City of Melbourne, before being approved by the Minister for Planning Richard Wynne in March 2016. Construction on the North Tower commenced in January 2018 and was completed in 2021.

See also

 List of tallest buildings in Melbourne

References

External links
 

Skyscrapers in Melbourne
Residential skyscrapers in Australia
Apartment buildings in Melbourne
Proposed skyscrapers in Australia
Buildings and structures in Melbourne City Centre